
Gmina Czerwieńsk is an urban-rural gmina (administrative district) in Zielona Góra County, Lubusz Voivodeship, in western Poland.

The gmina contains part of the protected area called Gryżyna Landscape Park.

Villages
Apart from the town of Czerwieńsk, Gmina Czerwieńsk contains the villages and settlements of Będów, Bródki, Dobrzęcin, Laski, Leśniów Mały, Leśniów Wielki, Nietków, Nietkowice, Płoty, Sudoł, Sycowice, Wysokie and Zagórze.

Neighbouring gminas
Gmina Czerwieńsk is bordered by the gminas of Bytnica, Dąbie, Krosno Odrzańskie, Skąpe, Sulechów, Świdnica and Zielona Góra.

Twin towns – sister cities

Gmina Czerwieńsk is twinned with:
 Drebkau, Germany
 Suzdal, Russia

References

Czerwiensk
Zielona Góra County